Symmetries in quantum mechanics describe features of spacetime and particles which are unchanged under some transformation, in the context of quantum mechanics, relativistic quantum mechanics and quantum field theory, and with applications in the mathematical formulation of the standard model and condensed matter physics. In general, symmetry in physics, invariance, and conservation laws, are fundamentally important constraints for formulating physical theories and models. In practice, they are powerful methods for solving problems and predicting what can happen. While conservation laws do not always give the answer to the problem directly, they form the correct constraints and the first steps to solving a multitude of problems.

This article outlines the connection between the classical form of continuous symmetries as well as their quantum operators, and relates them to the Lie groups, and relativistic transformations in the Lorentz group and Poincaré group.

Notation

The notational conventions used in this article are as follows. Boldface indicates vectors, four vectors, matrices, and vectorial operators, while quantum states use bra–ket notation. Wide hats are for operators, narrow hats are for unit vectors (including their components in tensor index notation). The summation convention on the repeated tensor indices is used, unless stated otherwise. The Minkowski metric signature is (+−−−).

Symmetry transformations on the wavefunction in non-relativistic quantum mechanics

Continuous symmetries

Generally, the correspondence between continuous symmetries and conservation laws is given by Noether's theorem.

The form of the fundamental quantum operators, for example energy as a partial time derivative and momentum as a spatial gradient, becomes clear when one considers the initial state, then changes one parameter of it slightly. This can be done for displacements (lengths), durations (time), and angles (rotations). Additionally, the invariance of certain quantities can be seen by making such changes in lengths and angles, illustrating conservation of these quantities.

In what follows, transformations on only one-particle wavefunctions in the form:

are considered, where  denotes a unitary operator. Unitarity is generally required for operators representing transformations of space, time, and spin, since the norm of a state (representing the total probability of finding the particle somewhere with some spin) must be invariant under these transformations. The inverse is the Hermitian conjugate . The results can be extended to many-particle wavefunctions. Written in Dirac notation as standard, the transformations on quantum state vectors are:

and thus:

for any state ψ. Quantum operators representing observables are also required to be Hermitian so that their eigenvalues are real numbers, i.e. the operator equals its Hermitian conjugate, .

Overview of Lie group theory

Following are the key points of group theory relevant to quantum theory, examples are given throughout the article. For an alternative approach using matrix groups, see the books of Hall

Let  be a Lie group, which is a group that locally is parameterized by a finite number  of real continuously varying parameters . In more mathematical language, this means that  is a smooth manifold that is also a group, for which the group operations are smooth.
the dimension of the group, is the number of parameters it has.
The generators of the group are the partial derivatives of the group elements with respect to the group parameters with the result evaluated when the parameter is set to zero:  In the language of manifolds, the generators are the elements of the tangent space to G at the identity. The generators are also known as infinitesimal group elements or as the elements of the Lie algebra of G. (See the discussion below of the commutator.)  One aspect of generators in theoretical physics is they can be constructed themselves as operators corresponding to symmetries, which may be written as matrices, or as differential operators. In quantum theory, for unitary representations of the group, the generators require a factor of :  The generators of the group form a vector space, which means linear combinations of generators also form a generator.
The generators (whether matrices or differential operators) satisfy the commutation relations:  where  are the (basis dependent) structure constants of the group. This makes, together with the vector space property, the set of all generators of a group a Lie algebra. Due to the antisymmetry of the bracket, the structure constants of the group are antisymmetric in the first two indices. 
The representations of the group then describe the ways that the group  (or its Lie algebra) can act on a vector space. (The vector space might be, for example, the space of eigenvectors for a Hamiltonian having  as its symmetry group.) We denote the representations using a capital . These two representations are related as follows:  without summation on the repeated index . Representations are linear operators that take in group elements and preserve the composition rule: 
A representation which cannot be decomposed into a direct sum of other representations, is called irreducible.

There is an additional subtlety that arises in quantum theory, where two vectors that differ by multiplication by a scalar represent the same physical state. Here, the pertinent notion of representation is a projective representation, one that only satisfies the composition law up to a scalar. In the context of quantum mechanical spin, such representations are called spinorial.

Momentum and energy as generators of translation and time evolution, and rotation

The space translation operator  acts on a wavefunction to shift the space coordinates by an infinitesimal displacement .

The exponential functions arise by definition as those limits, due to Euler, and can be understood physically and mathematically as follows. Acting the infinitesimal operators on the wavefunction  times and taking the limit as  tends to infinity gives the finite operators.

Space and time translations commute, which means the operators and generators commute.

For a time-independent Hamiltonian, energy is conserved in time and quantum states are stationary states: the eigenstates of the Hamiltonian are the energy eigenvalues :

and all stationary states have the form

where  is the initial time, usually set to zero since there is no loss of continuity when the initial time is set.

Angular momentum as the generator of rotations

Orbital angular momentum

The rotation operator acts on a wavefunction to rotate the spatial coordinates of a particle by a constant angle :

where  are the rotated coordinates about an axis defined by a unit vector  through an angular increment , given by:

where  is a rotation matrix dependent on the axis and angle. In group theoretic language, the rotation matrices are group elements, and the angles and axis  are the parameters, of the three-dimensional special orthogonal group, SO(3). The rotation matrices about the standard Cartesian basis vector  through angle , and the corresponding generators of rotations , are:

It is not as obvious how to determine the rotational operator compared to space and time translations.

Rotations about the same axis do commute, for example a rotation through angles  and  about axis  can be written

However, rotations about different axes do not commute. The general commutation rules are summarized by

In this sense, orbital angular momentum has the common sense properties of rotations. Each of the above commutators can be easily demonstrated by holding an everyday object and rotating it through the same angle about any two different axes in both possible orderings; the final configurations are different.

In quantum mechanics, there is another form of rotation which mathematically appears similar to the orbital case, but has different properties, described next.

Spin angular momentum

All previous quantities have classical definitions. Spin is a quantity possessed by particles in quantum mechanics without any classical analogue, having the units of angular momentum. The spin vector operator is denoted . The eigenvalues of its components are the possible outcomes (in units of ) of a measurement of the spin projected onto one of the basis directions.

Rotations (of ordinary space) about an axis  through angle  about the unit vector  in space acting on a multicomponent wave function (spinor) at a point in space is represented by:

However, unlike orbital angular momentum in which the z-projection quantum number  can only take positive or negative integer values (including zero), the z-projection spin quantum number s can take all positive and negative half-integer values. There are rotational matrices for each spin quantum number.

Evaluating the exponential for a given z-projection spin quantum number s gives a (2s + 1)-dimensional spin matrix. This can be used to define a spinor as a column vector of 2s + 1 components which transforms to a rotated coordinate system according to the spin matrix at a fixed point in space.

For the simplest non-trivial case of s = 1/2, the spin operator is given by

where the Pauli matrices in the standard representation are:

Total angular momentum

The total angular momentum operator is the sum of the orbital and spin

and is an important quantity for multi-particle systems, especially in nuclear physics and the quantum chemistry of multi-electron atoms and molecules.

We have a similar rotation matrix:

Conserved quantities in the quantum harmonic oscillator

The dynamical symmetry group of the n dimensional quantum harmonic oscillator is the special unitary group SU(n). As an example, the number of infinitesimal generators of the corresponding Lie algebras of SU(2) and SU(3) are three and eight respectively. This leads to exactly three and eight independent conserved quantities (other than the Hamiltonian) in these systems.

The two dimensional quantum harmonic oscillator has the expected conserved quantities of the Hamiltonian and the angular momentum, but has additional hidden conserved quantities of energy level difference and another form of angular momentum.

Lorentz group in relativistic quantum mechanics

Following is an overview of the Lorentz group; a treatment of boosts and rotations in spacetime. Throughout this section, see (for example) T. Ohlsson (2011) and E. Abers (2004).

The Lorentz group is 6-dimensional.

Pure rotations in spacetime

The rotation matrices and rotation generators considered above form the spacelike part of a four-dimensional matrix, representing pure-rotation Lorentz transformations. Three of the Lorentz group elements  and generators  for pure rotations are:

The rotation matrices act on any four vector  and rotate the space-like components according to

leaving the time-like coordinate unchanged. In matrix expressions,  is treated as a column vector.

Pure boosts in spacetime

A boost with velocity  in the x, y, or z directions given by the standard Cartesian basis vector , are the boost transformation matrices. These matrices  and the corresponding generators  are the remaining three group elements and generators of the Lorentz group:

The boost matrices act on any four vector A = (A0, A1, A2, A3) and mix the time-like and the space-like components, according to:

The term "boost" refers to the relative velocity between two frames, and is not to be conflated with momentum as the generator of translations, as explained below.

Combining boosts and rotations

Products of rotations give another rotation (a frequent exemplification of a subgroup), while products of boosts and boosts or of rotations and boosts cannot be expressed as pure boosts or pure rotations. In general, any Lorentz transformation can be expressed as a product of a pure rotation and a pure boost. For more background see (for example) B.R. Durney (2011) and H.L. Berk et al. and references therein.

The boost and rotation generators have representations denoted  and  respectively, the capital  in this context indicates a group representation.

In all commutators, the boost entities mixed with those for rotations, although rotations alone simply give another rotation. Exponentiating the generators gives the boost and rotation operators which combine into the general Lorentz transformation, under which the spacetime coordinates transform from one rest frame to another boosted and/or rotating frame. Likewise, exponentiating the representations of the generators gives the representations of the boost and rotation operators, under which a particle's spinor field transforms.

In the literature, the boost generators  and rotation generators  are sometimes combined into one generator for Lorentz transformations , an antisymmetric four-dimensional matrix with entries:

and correspondingly, the boost and rotation parameters are collected into another antisymmetric four-dimensional matrix , with entries:

The general Lorentz transformation is then:

with summation over repeated matrix indices α and β. The Λ matrices act on any four vector A = (A0, A1, A2, A3) and mix the time-like and the space-like components, according to:

Transformations of spinor wavefunctions in relativistic quantum mechanics

In relativistic quantum mechanics, wavefunctions are no longer single-component scalar fields, but now 2(2s + 1) component spinor fields, where s is the spin of the particle. The transformations of these functions in spacetime are given below.

Under a proper orthochronous Lorentz transformation  in Minkowski space, all one-particle quantum states  locally transform under some representation  of the Lorentz group:

Real irreducible representations and spin

Defining new operators:

and these are essentially the commutators the orbital and spin angular momentum operators satisfy. Therefore,  and  form operator algebras analogous to angular momentum; same ladder operators, z-projections, etc., independently of each other as each of their components mutually commute. The matrices satisfying the above commutation relations are the same as for spins a and b have components given by multiplying Kronecker delta values with angular momentum matrix elements:

where in each case the row number m′n′ and column number mn are separated by a comma, and in turn:

and similarly for J(n). The three J(m) matrices are each  square matrices, and the three J(n) are each  square matrices. The integers or half-integers m and n numerate all the irreducible representations by, in equivalent notations used by authors: , which are each  square matrices.

Applying this to particles with spin ;
left-handed -component spinors transform under the real irreps ,
right-handed -component spinors transform under the real irreps ,
These are also real irreps, but as shown above, they split into complex conjugates.

Relativistic wave equations

In the context of the Dirac equation and Weyl equation, the Weyl spinors satisfying the Weyl equation transform under the simplest irreducible spin representations of the Lorentz group, since the spin quantum number in this case is the smallest non-zero number allowed:  1/2. The 2-component left-handed Weyl spinor transforms under  and the 2-component right-handed Weyl spinor transforms under . Dirac spinors satisfying the Dirac equation transform under the representation , the direct sum of the irreps for the Weyl spinors.

The Poincaré group in relativistic quantum mechanics and field theory

Space translations, time translations, rotations, and boosts, all taken together, constitute the Poincaré group. The group elements are the three rotation matrices and three boost matrices (as in the Lorentz group), and one for time translations and three for space translations in spacetime. There is a generator for each. Therefore, the Poincaré group is 10-dimensional.

In special relativity, space and time can be collected into a four-position vector , and in parallel so can energy and momentum which combine into a four-momentum vector . With relativistic quantum mechanics in mind, the time duration and spatial displacement parameters (four in total, one for time and three for space) combine into a spacetime displacement , and the energy and momentum operators are inserted in the four-momentum to obtain a four-momentum operator,

which are the generators of spacetime translations (four in total, one time and three space):

There are commutation relations between the components four-momentum P (generators of spacetime translations), and angular momentum M (generators of Lorentz transformations), that define the Poincaré algebra:

 
 
 

where η is the Minkowski metric tensor. (It is common to drop any hats for the four-momentum operators in the commutation relations). These equations are an expression of the fundamental properties of space and time as far as they are known today. They have a classical counterpart where the commutators are replaced by Poisson brackets.

To describe spin in relativistic quantum mechanics, the Pauli–Lubanski pseudovector

a Casimir operator, is the constant spin contribution to the total angular momentum, and there are commutation relations between P and W and between M and W:

Invariants constructed from W, instances of Casimir invariants can be used to classify irreducible representations of the Lorentz group.

Symmetries in quantum field theory and particle physics

Unitary groups in quantum field theory

Group theory is an abstract way of mathematically analyzing symmetries. Unitary operators are paramount to quantum theory, so unitary groups are important in particle physics. The group of N dimensional unitary square matrices is denoted U(N). Unitary operators preserve inner products which means probabilities are also preserved, so the quantum mechanics of the system is invariant under unitary transformations. Let  be a unitary operator, so the inverse is the Hermitian adjoint , which commutes with the Hamiltonian:

then the observable corresponding to the operator  is conserved, and the Hamiltonian is invariant under the transformation .

Since the predictions of quantum mechanics should be invariant under the action of a group, physicists look for unitary transformations to represent the group.

Important subgroups of each U(N) are those unitary matrices which have unit determinant (or are "unimodular"): these are called the special unitary groups and are denoted SU(N).

U(1)

The simplest unitary group is U(1), which is just the complex numbers of modulus 1. This one-dimensional matrix entry is of the form:

in which θ is the parameter of the group, and the group is Abelian since one-dimensional matrices always commute under matrix multiplication. Lagrangians in quantum field theory for complex scalar fields are often invariant under U(1) transformations. If there is a quantum number a associated with the U(1) symmetry, for example baryon and the three lepton numbers in electromagnetic interactions, we have:

U(2) and SU(2)

The general form of an element of a U(2) element is parametrized by two complex numbers a and b:

and for SU(2), the determinant is restricted to 1:

In group theoretic language, the Pauli matrices are the generators of the special unitary group in two dimensions, denoted SU(2). Their commutation relation is the same as for orbital angular momentum, aside from a factor of 2:

A group element of SU(2) can be written:

where σj is a Pauli matrix, and the group parameters are the angles turned through about an axis.

The two-dimensional isotropic quantum harmonic oscillator has symmetry group SU(2), while the symmetry algebra of the rational anisotropic oscillator is a nonlinear extension of u(2).

U(3) and SU(3)

The eight Gell-Mann matrices  (see article for them and the structure constants) are important for quantum chromodynamics. They originally arose in the theory SU(3) of flavor which is still of practical importance in nuclear physics. They are the generators for the SU(3) group, so an element of SU(3) can be written analogously to an element of SU(2):

where  are eight independent parameters. The  matrices satisfy the commutator:

The structure constants fabc are totally antisymmetric in all indices analogous to those of SU(2). In the standard colour charge basis (r for red, g for green, b for blue):

The representations of SU(3) can be described by a "theorem of the highest weight".

Matter and antimatter

In relativistic quantum mechanics, relativistic wave equations predict a remarkable symmetry of nature: that every particle has a corresponding antiparticle. This is mathematically contained in the spinor fields which are the solutions of the relativistic wave equations.

Charge conjugation switches particles and antiparticles. Physical laws and interactions unchanged by this operation have C symmetry.

Discrete spacetime symmetries

Parity mirrors the orientation of the spatial coordinates from left-handed to right-handed. Informally, space is "reflected" into its mirror image. Physical laws and interactions unchanged by this operation have P symmetry.
Time reversal flips the time coordinate, which amounts to time running from future to past. A curious property of time, which space does not have, is that it is unidirectional: particles traveling forwards in time are equivalent to antiparticles traveling back in time. Physical laws and interactions unchanged by this operation have T symmetry.

C, P, T symmetries

CPT theorem
CP violation
PT symmetry
Lorentz violation

Gauge theory

In quantum electrodynamics, the local symmetry group is U(1) and is abelian. In quantum chromodynamics, the local symmetry group is SU(3) and is non-abelian.

The electromagnetic interaction is mediated by photons, which have no electric charge. The electromagnetic tensor has an electromagnetic four-potential field possessing gauge symmetry.

The strong (color) interaction is mediated by gluons, which can have eight color charges. There are eight gluon field strength tensors with corresponding gluon four potentials field, each possessing gauge symmetry.

The strong (color) interaction

Color charge

Analogous to the spin operator, there are color charge operators in terms of the Gell-Mann matrices :

and since color charge is a conserved charge, all color charge operators must commute with the Hamiltonian:

Isospin

Isospin is conserved in strong interactions.

The weak and electromagnetic interactions

Duality transformation

Magnetic monopoles can be theoretically realized, although current observations and theory are consistent with them existing or not existing. Electric and magnetic charges can effectively be "rotated into one another" by a duality transformation.

Electroweak symmetry

Electroweak symmetry
Electroweak symmetry breaking

Supersymmetry

A Lie superalgebra is an algebra in which (suitable) basis elements either have a commutation relation or have an anticommutation relation. Symmetries have been proposed to the effect that all fermionic particles have bosonic analogues, and vice versa. These symmetry have theoretical appeal in that no extra assumptions (such as existence of strings) barring symmetries are made. In addition, by assuming supersymmetry, a number of puzzling issues can be resolved. These symmetries, which are represented by Lie superalgebras, have not been confirmed experimentally. It is now believed that they are broken symmetries, if they exist. But it has been speculated that dark matter is constitutes gravitinos, a spin 3/2 particle with mass, its supersymmetric partner being the graviton.

Exchange symmetry or permutation symmetry

The concept of exchange symmetry or permutation symmetry is derived from a fundamental postulate of quantum statistics, which states that no observable physical quantity should change after exchanging two identical particles. More generally, for a system of n identical particles the wave function  must transform as an irreducible representation of the finite symmetric group Sn. It turns out that, according to the Spin-statistics theorem, fermion states transform as the antisymmetric irreducible representation of Sn and boson states as the symmetric irreducible representation. For the symmetry classification of the rovibronic states of molecules Longuet-Higgins introduced the Molecular Symmetry Group as a group of appropriate identical nuclear permutations and permutations with spatial inversion. 

Because the exchange of two identical particles is mathematically equivalent to the rotation of each particle by 180 degrees (and so to the rotation of one particle's frame by 360 degrees), the symmetric nature of the wave function depends on the particle's spin after the rotation operator is applied to it. Integer spin particles do not change the sign of their wave function upon a 360 degree rotation—therefore the sign of the wave function of the entire system does not change.  Semi-integer spin particles change the sign of their wave function upon a 360 degree rotation (see more in spin–statistics theorem).

Particles for which the wave function does not change sign upon exchange are called bosons, or particles with a symmetric wave function. The particles for which the wave function of the system changes sign are called fermions, or particles with an antisymmetric wave function.

Fermions therefore obey different statistics (called Fermi–Dirac statistics) than bosons (which obey Bose–Einstein statistics). One of the consequences of Fermi–Dirac statistics is the exclusion principle for fermions—no two identical fermions can share the same quantum state (in other words, the wave function of two identical fermions in the same state is zero). This in turn results in degeneracy pressure for fermions—the strong resistance of fermions to compression into smaller volume. This resistance gives rise to the “stiffness” or “rigidity” of ordinary atomic matter (as atoms contain electrons which are fermions).

See also

 Symmetric group
 Spin-statistics theorem
 Projective representation
 Casimir operator
 Pauli–Lubanski pseudovector
 Symmetries in general relativity
 Renormalization group
 Representation of a Lie group
 Representation theory of the Poincaré group
 Representation theory of the Lorentz group

Footnotes

References

Further reading

External links
(2010) Irreducible Tensor Operators and the Wigner-Eckart Theorem 

Lie groups

Continuous Groups, Lie Groups, and Lie Algebras 

Pauli exclusion principle
Special relativity
Quantum field theory
Group theory
Theoretical physics